De Argüello is a Spanish surname. Notable people with the surname include:

Fernando de Argüello (1644–1647), Spanish soldier served as Governor of New Mexico

See also
Arguello, comune in Italy
Argüello

Spanish-language surnames